Taniela Paseka (born 8 October 1997) is a professional rugby league footballer who plays as a  for the Manly Warringah Sea Eagles in the NRL.

Background
Paseka was born in Otahuhu, New Zealand and is of Tongan descent. 

He played his junior rugby league for All Saints Liverpool junior and attended Mount Carmel Catholic High School,Varroville Patrician Brothers' College, Fairfield.

Playing career

Early career
Paseka played in the Under 20s for the Wests Tigers before joining Manly for the 2018 season, he also appeared in a Musashi ad.

2018
In round 6 of the 2018 NRL season, Paseka made his Manly début in the National Rugby League against the Wests Tigers.
Paseka played a total of 13 games for Manly in 2018 as the club endured one of their worst seasons on the field finishing 15th on the table and narrowly avoiding the wooden spoon.

2019
Paseka made 13 appearances for Manly in the 2019 NRL season as the club finished sixth on the table.  Paseka missed out on playing in the club's finals campaign with a knee injury he sustained in round 25 against Parramatta.

2020
Paseka played 18 games for Manly-Warringah in the 2020 NRL season as they finished a disappointing 13th on the table.

2021
Paseka played 24 games for Manly in the 2021 NRL season including the club's preliminary final loss against South Sydney.

2022
Paseka made 11 appearances for Manly in the 2022 NRL season.  The club would finish 11th on the table and miss out on the finals.

References

External links
Manly Sea Eagles profile

1997 births
Living people
Manly Warringah Sea Eagles players
New Zealand rugby league players
New Zealand sportspeople of Tongan descent
Rugby league players from Auckland
Rugby league props